Annemarie Reinhard (official name after marriage Annemarie Gode) (29 November 1921 – 10 November 1976) was a German writer.

Life
Annemarie Reinhard was born in Dresden.  After her finishing high school, she worked as a tailor.  She joined the Socialist Unity Party of Germany in 1948.  A friendship connected her with Danish author Martin Andersen Nexø.  She began in 1949 to publish her literary works.  Together with her husband, the writer Götz Gode, she lived in Dresden until her death.

Annemarie Reinhard wrote novels and narratives for adults and children.  Her novel Treibgut dealt with the fate of two refugee orphans after World War II, Tag im Nebel is the history of an escape from the French Foreign Legion and Flucht aus Hohenwaldau is themed around the state organized Nazi eugenics during the Third Reich.

Annemarie Reinhard was a member of the Schriftstellerverband of East Germany and functioned as chairwoman of the Bezirk Dresden association from 1956.  She would receive the 1960 Heinrich Mann Prize and the 1964 Martin Andersen Nexö Kunstpreis of the City of Dresden.

Works
 Treibgut, Dresden 1949
 Wegweiser, Dresden 1952
 In den Sommer hinein, Dresden 1953
 Tag im Nebel, Berlin 1958
 Sieben Körner Reis, Berlin 1960
 Brigitte macht die Probe, Berlin 1963
 Flucht aus Hohenwaldau, Berlin 1970
 Ferien beim Rattenfänger, Berlin 1980
 Genossenschaftsbauern – "Helden der Arbeit", Wegbereiter des neuen Lebens, 1953 with Walter Stranka

Translations
 Janina Dziarnowska: Das Haus an der Rennbahn, Dresden 1953

External links
 Literature by and on Annemarie Reinhard in the Catlog of the German National Library

1921 births
1976 deaths
Writers from Dresden
Heinrich Mann Prize winners
20th-century German women writers